Interferon regulatory factor 7, also known as IRF7, is a member of the interferon regulatory factor family of transcription factors.

Function 

IRF7 encodes interferon regulatory factor 7, a member of the interferon regulatory transcription factor (IRF) family. IRF7 has been shown to play a role in the transcriptional activation of virus-inducible cellular genes, including the type I interferon genes. In particular, IRF7 regulates many interferon-alpha genes. Constitutive expression of IRF7 is largely restricted to lymphoid tissue, largely plasmacytoid dendritic cells, whereas IRF7 is inducible in many tissues. Multiple IRF7 transcript variants have been identified, although the functional consequences of these have not yet been established.

The IRF7 pathway was shown to be silenced in some metastatic breast cancer cell lines, which may help the cells avoid the host immune response. Restoring IRF7 to these cell lines reduced metastases and increased host survival time in animal models.

The IRF7 gene and product were shown to be defective in a patient with severe susceptibility to H1N1 influenza, while susceptibility to other viral diseases such as CMV, RSV, and parainfluenza was unaffected.

Interactions 

IRF7 has been shown to interact with IRF3. Also, IRF7 has been shown to interact with Aryl Hydrocarbon Receptor Interacting Protein (AIP), which is a negative regulator for the antiviral pathway.

See also 
 Interferon regulatory factors

References

Further reading

External links

Transcription factors